The Widi  were an Aboriginal Australian people of the Mid West region of Western Australia.

Country
The Widi were native to the area between Lakes Monger and Moore. To the north, they were present around Yuin, Talleringa Peak, and Nalbarra. Their western confines ran to Mullewa and Morawa (Morowa). Their eastern limits lay at Paynes Find and Wogarno, south of Mount Magnet. Yalgoo and the upper Greenough River were also part of Widi territory.

Reputation
To gather from evidence taken at Lake Darlot, the Widi had a certain reputation for savagery even among tribes far to their west.

Social organization and customs
The Widi made both circumcision and subincision an integral part of their initiation ceremonies.

Alternative names
 Wiri (wiri signifies 'no').
 Minango. ('southerners.' Watjarri exonym)
 Minangu.
 Nanakari. (Nokaan exonym)
 Nanakati. ('my people')
 Barimaia.  (Watjarri exonym denoting both the Widi and the Badimaya).
 Jaburu. ("northerners", perhaps a Ballardong term).

Notes

Citations

Sources

Aboriginal peoples of Western Australia